Cardozo Manalo Luna (born September 7, 1953) is a retired three-star general and the 35th Vice Chief of Staff of the Armed Forces of the Philippines. Cardozo Luna also served as the commander of two unified commands, Eastern Mindanao Command and Central Command. He served as the Philippine Ambassador to The Hague, Netherlands from 2009 until 2010  He is the current Undersecretary of Department of National Defense.

Background
Cardozo was born to lawyer and retired colonel (Philippine Constabulary) Raymundo V. Luna and his wife, Teofista M. Luna.  He was born in San Ildefonso, Bulacan, Philippines and raised in Santo Tomas, Batangas where he graduated consistently on top of his elementary and high school classes. Owing to Colonel Luna's profession as a lawyer, his son Cardozo is named after Benjamin N. Cardozo, the renowned Associate Justice of the United States Supreme Court who significantly contributed to the development of American Civil Law in the 20th century. He descended from the Luna clans of Badoc, Ilocos Norte where the ancestry of Antonio Luna and Juan Luna, members of the 1896 Philippine Revolution also came from.

He is married to Mrs. Joyce Marcelina Espinosa Siongco Luna. She is the daughter of Brig. General Gonzalo H. Siongco, the first Commanding General of the 6th Infantry (Kampilan) Division.  Cardozo and Joyce have two sons and three daughters.

Education
Cardozo is a member of the Philippine Military Academy "Makabayan" Class of 1975, graduated number 6 in a class of 91. Prior to his admission to PMA as a cadet, Cardozo Luna entered Mapúa Institute of Technology taking up Civil Engineering.  While already in the service, he pursued post-graduate courses in the Philippines and the United States.  He graduated with Masters in Economics Development from the University of the Philippines.  He also obtained his second graduate degree of Master of Arts in Economics Planning and poised to complete his Doctoral Degree in Regional Economics at the prestigious Ivy League business school of the University of Pennsylvania. He is a member of the prestigious Wharton-Penn Club of the Philippines. He is also a Defense Diplomacy Fellow in Cranfield University in the United Kingdom.

Other than being touted as an academic giant in the military, Cardozo also excelled in his military education and training record.  He attained top honors when he took the PC Officers Basic Course, PC Officers Advance Course (August 1988), and the AFP Command and General Staff Course and the Joint Command and Staff Course in April 1995 at the Armed Forces of the Philippines Command and General Staff College.

Military career

Upon graduation from the academy, Cardozo was commissioned as Second Lieutenant and joined the Philippine Constabulary.  He spent most of his junior-officer's years in Mindanao. After his stint in Mindanao, he served as Junior Staff at AFP General Headquarters & Headquarters Service Command and at Department of National Defense.  He was also assigned as a Junior Staff at the defense attaché in Washington, D.C., USA from 1981 until 1984. Upon his return to the country, he served as Vice President of the Armed Forces & Police Mutual Benefit Association (AFPMBAI) and, soon after, as Vice President/Assistant General Manager of the Armed Forces & Police Savings and Loan Association Inc. (AFPSLAI).  In 1987, he assumed as the District Commander of the Philippine Constabulary 1st District, Regional Command (RECOM) 4 and later served as the Commanding Officer of the 214th PC Coy, RECOM 4 in Batangas.

Among the significant positions he held in the past were: Defense Intelligence Security Group and Military Intelligence Group (MIG) Commander; Battalion Commander of the 37th Infantry Brigade, 6th Infantry Division in Mindanao from November 16, 1995 to May 16, 1997; Assistant Chief of Staff of the Civil Military Operations (G7) of the Philippine Army from November 18, 1997 to July 23, 1999; Commanding Officer of the 302nd Infantry Brigade, 3rd Infantry Division from June 28, 2001 to April 16, 2002.

Upon promotion to star-rank, he assumed positions of higher responsibility as Commanding General of the 602nd Infantry Brigade, 6th Infantry Division  from April 16, 2002 to July 25, 2003; Commandant of Cadets and Head, Tactics Group of the Philippine Military Academy from July 21, 2003 to October 18, 2004; Commanding General, Training and Doctrine Command from October 25, 2004 to November 7, 2005; Commanding General of the 4th Infantry (Diamond) Division from November 2, 2005 to August 10, 2006; Commander of the AFP Central Command based in Cebu City from August 2, 2006 to August 30, 2007 where he also supervised the security of the ASEAN Summit protecting 18 Heads of State; and Commander of the AFP Eastern Mindanao Command based in Davao City from August 31, 2007 to May 16, 2008. During his stint as the Commanding General of the AFP EastMinCom, he commanded and controlled 3 Army Infantry Divisions, a Naval Force, a Tactical Operations Wing, and several AFP Wide Service Support Units in Eastern Mindanao whose area of responsibility covers Regions 10, 11, 12, Caraga Region, and three provinces of ARMM such as: Maguindanao, Sharif Kabunsuan, and Lanao del Sur, consisting of not less than 25,000 uniformed personnel and civilian employees of the AFP.

Luna is a recipient of various military awards and decorations (including the Distinguished Service Star), numerous Letters of Commendations from various military officers and Resolutions from Chief Executives of government agencies and Local Government Units for his valuable services rendered as an officer and a gentleman.

Col. Cardozo Luna, head of the 602nd Infantry Brigade, captured a key rebel stronghold of the Moro Islamic Liberation Front on February 14, 2003. The stronghold is located in Buliok complex in Cotabato and Maguindanao, part of a major offensive on the southern island of Mindanao.  After the successful campaign, Luna earned his first star as Brigadier General.

Brig. Gen. Cardozo M. Luna, 56th Commandant of the Philippine Military Academy, changed the required uniforms of the cadets from the West Point-inspired military cut to the rayadillo, the same uniform that was designed by Antonio Luna and was worn by the Filipino forefathers during the Philippine revolution against Spain.

The newly installed Central Command chief, Maj. Gen. Cardozo Luna vowed to reduce the threat posed by the New People's Army, armed wing of the Communist Party of the Philippines, to an "inconsequential level through simultaneous in-depth operations" in the Visayas region (Panay, Negros, Cebu, Bohol, Samar and Leyte). Upon assuming one of the largest military commands in the Philippines in August 2006, Luna issued guidelines for military commanders in the Visayas, that include strengthening of Citizen Armed Force Geographical Unit battalions, implementation of a long range patrol concept and conduct of regular patrols, effective unit leadership, activation of Civil Military Operations Company and task group, and tapping the services of military reservists, police and local government units as well. he always emphasized the respect for human rights in all conduct of military operations.

After a successful stint in the central region of the country in 2006, Eastern Mindanao Command chief, Lt. Gen. Cardozo Luna, together with other top military officials in Mindanao, expressed the need to institutionalize trainings on peace building and conflict management to help bring about peace in the south. However, Luna stressed that peace trainings should be documented and validated by appropriate agencies to see if the trainings and efforts could be replicated by other units.  According to Luna, sustaining the peace building efforts should be maintained even after change of commands of military units across the country.

On August 10, 2008, when rogue MILF forces conducted atrocities as a result of the botched Memorandum of Agreement on Ancestral Domain, military troops led by Lt. Gen. Cardozo Luna, Joint Force Mindanao commander, regained control of two North Cotabato villages from Moro Islamic Liberation Front rebels and pressed ahead with a massive assault to clear 13 others.  The fighting has forced about 130,000 villagers to flee their homes. On August 28, 2008, Luna lead the invasion of Camp Bilal, a major Moro Islamic Liberation Front rebel camp in Lanao del Norte, the headquarters of Commander Macapaar, the leader of the attacks on five Lanao del Norte towns. During the 73rd Anniversary Ceremony of the AFP at Camp Aguinaldo on December 22, 2008, the Philippine Legion of Honor (PLOH) degree of Commander was awarded to Luna for leading government troops that fought rogue Moro fighters including the successful campaign at Camp Bilal and the Lanao provinces.

Awards in military service
  Philippine Republic Presidential Unit Citation
  People Power I Unit Citation
  People Power II Ribbon
  Martial Law Unit Citation 
  Distinguished Service Stars
  Officer, Philippine Legion of Honor
  Outstanding Achievement Medals
   Gawad sa Kaunlaran
   Bronze Cross Medal
   Military Merit Medals with two bronze spearhead devices and three bronze anahaws
   Military Commendation Medals
  Military Civic Action Medal 
   Sagisag ng Ulirang Kawal
  Long Service Medal
  Anti-dissidence Campaign Medal 
  Luzon Anti-Dissidence Campaign Medal
  Visayas Anti-Dissidence Campaign Medal
  Mindanao Anti-Dissidence Campaign Medal
  Disaster Relief and Rehabilitation Operations Ribbon
  Combat Commander's Badge
  Special Forces Qualification Badge

Diplomatic career
Lt. Gen. Cardozo Luna was originally set to retire on September 7, 2009, but opted to retire four months early in view of his nomination to the post of the highest ranking Filipino diplomat to the Netherlands. He will serve as the focal person for the Philippines' defense engagements not only in Netherlands but as well as with other countries in Europe.

On May 20, 2009, Cardozo Luna was appointed by President Gloria Macapagal-Arroyo with the approval of the Commission on Appointments as the Philippine Ambassador to Netherlands. Along with Luna, President Arroyo has also appointed six new ambassadors to Spain, the United Kingdom, the Vatican, Finland, Brazil and Timor-Leste.

Cardozo Luna assumed the post of Ambassador Extraordinary and Plenipotentiary of the Republic of the Philippines to The Netherlands, replacing Ambassador Romeo Arguelles, on August 6, 2009. Luna intended to make his contribution to further strengthen the existing political, economic, cultural, and security relations between the Philippines and the Netherlands, as well as actively promote peace-making initiatives through multilateral relations. He was designated as the Permanent Representative of the Republic of the Philippines to the Organisation for the Prohibition of Chemical Weapons (OPCW), an international agency, located in The Hague, Netherlands. He also became the Governor of the Common Fund for Commodities, a UN funded organization assisting Third World countries to increase food production.

Ambassador Luna presented his Letter of Credence to Her Majesty Queen Beatrix of Netherlands on August 26, 2009.  After the ceremony, Queen Beatrix invited Luna to a private meeting, discussing bilateral matters between the Philippines and the Netherlands. Luna assured that the relationship between the two countries will be strengthened during his term.

During the PMAAAI 2010 Annual General Membership Meeting held at the Manila Hotel on January 24, 2010, Nicanor A. Bartolome, President of the Philippine Military Academy Alumni Association, Inc. (PMAAAI), awarded Ambassador Luna the Cavalier Outstanding Achievement Award in recognition of his exemplary commitment and dedication to service.

Several Dutch businessmen worked hard to persuade their compatriots to invest in the Philippines during the Philippine Netherlands Business Council (PNBC) meeting on July 9, 2010.  Ambassador Cardozo Luna supported the testimonies and assured the potential investors that the business is very promising in the Philippines especially in the new government of President Benigno “Noynoy” Aquino III.  According to Luna, the United Nations Economic and Social Commission for Asia and the Pacific gave a projection that the Philippine economy will grow by 3.5% in 2010.

The Philippines marked a milestone after it became a member of the oldest international legal organizations in the Netherlands on July 14, 2010.  Ambassador Luna transmitted the Instrument of Acceptance of the Statute of the Hague Conference on Private International Law and the Act of Accession to the Convention for the Pacific Settlement of International Disputes to the Ministry of Foreign Affairs of the Netherlands.  The documents were signed by then President Gloria Macapagal-Arroyo on the 25th and 29 June 2010. The Philippines officially became the 70th member of the Hague Conference on Private International Law and the 111th member of the Permanent Court of Arbitration on September 12, 2010.

As part of the public diplomacy efforts of the Philippine Embassy in The Hague, a workshop was conducted on the Philippines’ migrant worker protection laws to the students of the Hague Academy of International Law on July 20, 2010.  Ambassador Luna opened the program by citing the Philippines’ membership in the Hague Conference on Private International Law and the Permanent Court of Arbitration. He also made reference to the directive of President Aquino for the Department of Foreign Affairs and other relevant agencies to be more receptive to the needs and welfare of 8.7 to 11 million overseas Filipino workers.

On September 30, 2010, Ambassador Luna left his post in the Netherlands.  After the three-month extension set by the Department of Foreign Affairs for the non-career envoys under President Gloria Macapagal-Arroyo, 25 ambassadors were ordered to report back to the Philippines.

Civilian career
On May 26, 2012, Cardozo was elected as the President and chief executive officer of the Armed Forces and Police Savings & Loan Association (AFPSLAI), a private, non-stock and non-profit savings and loan association established and registered with the Philippine Securities and Exchange Commission in 1972. It is supervised by the Bangko Sentral ng Pilipinas and one of the leading providers of financial products and allied services to the Armed Forces of the Philippines, Philippine National Police, Bureau of Jail Management and Penology, and Bureau of Fire Protection.

During the AFPSLAI's 41st Annual Membership Meeting on May 25, 2013, Cardozo announced that the company made a quantum leap towards its financial targets where the company's gross income reached PHP 7.96 billion, 16% higher than the previous year. The highest net income was recorded in 2012 compared to 2004 which was considered by the company as its benchmark year. Other financial highlights of his report compare to the previous year are as follows: 3% lower Total Expenses of PHP 1.69 billion; 10% higher Total Assets of PHP 49.94 billion; 18% higher Loans Production of PHP 35.56 billion; and 9% higher Capital Contribution of PHP 33.58 billion. Among the company's operational highlights were the enhancement of the company's computerized system; improvement of processing time for vehicle loan; enhancement of consumption loans being offered to BFP and BJMP market; reduction of pension advance charges; and improvement for the convenience of transacting members of Iloilo Branch Office with the inauguration of its new building in May 2012.  AFPSLAI's advocacy on corporate philanthropy is also recognized as one of its paramount achievements. Cardozo stressed that through its 40 years of providing financial solutions to members’ needs, the AFPSLAI's initiatives to reinforce corporate social responsibility is just as important. Some of the programs are the Donation Program where a total of PHP 27.72 million was given to major service units of members agencies, Outreach Program through medical missions in AFPSLAI Branch Offices, Scholarship Program which has produced 152 graduates, and the Assistance to Lift Members’ Survivors (ALMS) Program that released a total of PHP 36.66 million as financial assistance to legal beneficiaries of qualified deceased members.

Cardozo served as the President and CEO until September 9, 2013, where he was succeeded by Col. Diosdado Domingo (Ret.). Cardozo remained as both Member and Vice Chairman of the Board of Trustees until June 2016.

National Defense Undersecretary
President Rodrigo Duterte assumed office in June 2016 and Maj. Gen. Delfin Lorenzana (Ret.) was designated as the 36th Secretary of National Defense.  In July 2016, Secretary Delfin Lorenzana announced that Cardozo Luna will be the Undersecretary of National Defense.

References

External links
Department of National Defense
Embassy of the Philippines: The Hague, Netherlands 
Armed Forces of the Philippines

1953 births
People from Bulacan
People from Batangas
Filipino generals
Philippine Military Academy alumni
Mapúa University alumni
University of the Philippines alumni
Wharton School of the University of Pennsylvania alumni
Living people
Filipino diplomats
Ambassadors of the Philippines to the Netherlands
Permanent Representatives of the Philippines to the Organisation for the Prohibition of Chemical Weapons
Members of the Permanent Court of Arbitration
Recipients of the Distinguished Service Star
Recipients of the Philippine Legion of Honor
Recipients of the Outstanding Achievement Medal
Recipients of the Bronze Cross Medal
Recipients of the Military Merit Medal (Philippines)
Recipients of the Military Commendation Medal
Recipients of the Military Civic Action Medal
Arroyo administration personnel
Duterte administration personnel
Filipino judges of international courts and tribunals